The Porto–Vigo high-speed rail line is a proposed high-speed rail line in Portugal, linking its second largest city Porto with the Spanish city of Vigo, Galicia.

Background
Porto and Vigo are currently served by the Celta service, taking 2 hours and 23 minutes to complete its journey.

High-speed rail in Portugal was planned in the 1990s and formally announced in 2005, which included the Lisbon–Madrid high-speed rail line, a Lisbon to Porto line and the line from Porto to Vigo, Spain. The plan was cancelled in 2009 due to the economic downturn.

In 2020 the plan was reactivated as part of an initiative by the Portuguese government to invest €43 billion into infrastructure projects by 2030.

Construction
The initial phase will consist of a line between Braga and Vigo at a cost of €900 million, with a proposed 30 minute journey time between the two cities.

Route
The line will link Porto to Vigo via Porto Airport, Braga and Valença, relieving capacity on the existing Linha do Minho. At Vigo, it would join the Atlantic Axis high-speed rail line.

See also
 High-speed rail in Portugal
 Lisbon–Madrid high-speed rail line
 Lisbon–Porto high-speed rail line

References

Rail transport in Portugal